Saudi Gazette is an English-language daily newspaper launched in 1976 and published in Jeddah, Saudi Arabia. It is only available online, as the print version was discontinued in 2019. It is the second English-language daily newspaper in Saudi Arabia.

Published by Okaz Organization for Press and Publication, Saudi Gazette has caught on among Saudis and non-Saudis.

See also 
 List of newspapers in Saudi Arabia

References 

1976 establishments in Saudi Arabia
Publications established in 1976
English-language newspapers published in Arab countries
Newspapers published in Saudi Arabia
Mass media in Jeddah
Arab mass media
Online newspapers with defunct print editions